Nosphidia is a monotypic moth genus in the family Carposinidae. It contains the single species Nosphidia paradoxa, which is found in Sri Lanka. Both the genus and species were first described by Alexey Diakonoff in 1982.

References

Carposinidae